William McG. Morrison (1903 – January 1, 1960) was the fifty-seventh mayor of Charleston, South Carolina, serving between two terms between 1947 and 1959. He was the first person elected to three terms as mayor of Charleston as a result of his win in June 1955. He lost his fourth bid by 455 votes to J. Palmer Gaillard, Jr. on June 9, 1959.

In his first term, Morrison originated the idea of closing the historic Charleston Orphan House and creating a new orphanage in the nearby suburbs around a series of cottages. During his final term in office, Morrison proposed changing the form of government to a manager system. He also proposed constructing a 700 foot long park along the Ashley River at the foot of Bee Street (in the footprint of what is now the southern Ashley River Bridge). Morrison favored creating a new city by merging Charleston with its neighboring city, North Charleston.

Morrison was born on January 8, 1903, to Henry Toomer Morrison and Sadie McGillivray Morrison. In October 1957, Morrison was diagnosed with throat cancer and underwent extensive radiation treatment which left him weakened. He attended his final city council meeting in August 1959 before becoming too ill with kidney problems and side effects of his radiation treatment. He thereafter carried out city business from his home at 103 South Battery. He died on January 1, 1960, and is buried at St. Philips Episcopal Church in Charleston, South Carolina.

References

1903 births
1960 deaths
20th-century American politicians
American people of Scottish descent
Mayors of Charleston, South Carolina
Deaths from cancer in South Carolina
Deaths from throat cancer